HIP 5158 is a 10th magnitude K-type main-sequence star located approximately 169 light years away in the constellation Cetus. This star is smaller, cooler, fainter, and less massive than the Sun, but it is more metal rich, having concentration of heavy elements equal to 125% of solar abundance.

Planetary system
In 2009, a gas giant planet was found in orbit around the star. The quadratic drift in the radial velocities did indicate the presence of an additional outer planet in the system, which was confirmed in 2011 as brown dwarf HIP 5158 c.

See also 
 List of extrasolar planets

References 

K-type main-sequence stars
Planetary systems with two confirmed planets
Cetus (constellation)
J01060202-2227111
Durchmusterung objects
005158